Neyjeh (also Romanized as Ney Jeh; also known as Neyīeh and Nīyeh) is a village in Rahjerd-e Sharqi Rural District, Salafchegan District, Qom County, Qom Province, Iran. At the 2006 census, its population was 116, in 35 families.

References 

Populated places in Qom Province